Chaucer is a lunar impact crater that is located to the west of the walled plain Hertzsprung, on the far side of the Moon. It lies to the northwest of the crater Vavilov and east of the Tsander–Kibal'chich crater pair. This is a circular crater with a slightly eroded outer rim. The interior floor is nearly featureless, with only a few tiny craterlets marking the surface. It is named after the writer Geoffrey Chaucer.

Satellite craters
By convention these features are identified on lunar maps by placing the letter on the side of the crater midpoint that is closest to Chaucer.

References

 
 
 
 
 
 
 
 
 
 
 
 

Impact craters on the Moon